Los que aman, odian is an Argentine thriller and police film of 2017 directed by Alejandro Maci and based on the novel by Bioy Casares and Silvina Ocampo. It stars Guillermo Francella and Luisana Lopilato in lead roles, and was filmed in Pinamar, Argentina.

Plot  
On a lonely beach, stands an old hotel lost in time. Enrique Hubermann (Guillermo Francella), a homeopathic doctor, travels fleeing from a love. By a chance of fate, in that distant place he meets Mary Fraga (Luisana Lopilato) the woman who he wants to forget, a beautiful young woman like a demon who manipulates men and causes dangerous passions. In the midst of a terrible storm that isolates them from the world, history repeats itself again. But on this occasion, the hatred of those who had loved too much awakens the worst of each.

Cast 
 Guillermo Francella as Dr. Enrique Hubermann
 Luisana Lopilato as Mary Fraga
 Justina Bustos as Emilia Fraga
 Juan Minujín as Atuel 
 Marilú Marini as Andrea, the hotel owner 
 Carlos Portaluppi as Commissar
 Mario Alarcón
 Gonzalo Urtizberea

Trailer 
In mid-July the film producer published a trailer of the film confirming the release of the film for September 2017.

Reception 
Commercial
The film premiered in Argentine cinemas with approximately 240 screens according to the distributor Buena Vista. In addition, some of the copies will have Spanish subtitles, a new trend in the industry to facilitate access to films for people with hearing problems.

External links
 Official site
 Trailer
 Cine Nacional
 Filmaffinity

2017 films
Argentine thriller films
2017 thriller films
2010s Argentine films